Alan Matthews may refer to:

 Alan Matthews (Boy Meets World), a character on Boy Meets World
 Alan Matthews (cricketer) (1913–1996), English cricketer

See also
Alan Mathews (born 1965), Irish football manager
Al Matthews (disambiguation)